Swampscott Fish House is a historic fishing supply storage house off Humphrey Street on Fisherman's Beach in Swampscott, Massachusetts. It is the oldest active fish house in the country.

The shingle-style house was built in 1896 on land taken by eminent domain. The Fish House consolidated the many fishing structures that stretched along the oceanfront obscuring views of the ocean and subtracting from the area's appeal as a swimming beach. The Fish House is also home to the Swampscott Yacht Club and the Swampscott Sailing Program.  The yacht club is refinished with a porch and a bar.

The building was added to the National Register of Historic Places in 1985.

See also
National Register of Historic Places listings in Essex County, Massachusetts

References

External links
Swampscott Yacht Club website

Commercial buildings on the National Register of Historic Places in Massachusetts
Commercial buildings completed in 1896
Shingle Style architecture in Massachusetts
Buildings and structures in Swampscott, Massachusetts
National Register of Historic Places in Essex County, Massachusetts